Stires is a surname. Notable people with the surname include:

Ernest M. Stires (1866–1951), American Episcopal bishop
Ernie Stires (1925–2008), American composer, musician
Gat Stires (1849–1933), American baseball player
Shanele Stires (born 1972), American basketball player & coach